Amina Baraka (born Sylvia Robinson; December 5, 1942) is an American poet, actress, author, community organizer, singer, dancer, and activist. Her poetic themes are about social justice, family, and women. Her poetry has been featured in anthologies including Unsettling America (1994).
She was active in the 1960s Black Arts Movement, as an artist.

Early life
Born in Charlotte, North Carolina, and raised in Newark, New Jersey, she graduated in 1960 from Newark Arts High School. After graduating, she became a dancer, actress, and poet. As an artist, she became a part of the Black Arts Movement in Newark. She performed at the Cellar located at the Jazz Arts Society.

Baraka's mother and grandfather were African-American union organizers in Newark in the 1940s. Their apartment was a gathering place for neighborhood organizing and culture. Her grandparents were blues artists; they played the guitar, harmonica, and piano. Her grandmother was known for community mothering, looking after neighbors in the neighborhood, preparing meals, clothing, and bathing children.

Career
Baraka was the founder of the African Free School in Newark, New Jersey, which was a liberation school for community children.  She is one of the founding members of the Newark Art Society in 1963. She wrote and performed dance dramas to music at the "loft" that later became known as the "Cellar". The Cellar, located at 22 Shipman Street in Newark, was the center for Jazz and Art in Newark. It was a collective of artists, and among the members were Art Williams, Bill Harris, Eddie Gladden, and Tom White. Many artists performed for the Jazz and Art society in Newark. Local musicians and artists, and artists from other parts of the country came to the "Cellar", including Marion Brown, Sun Ra, Ben Caldwell, Freddie Stringer, Charlie Mason, Tyrone Washington, Woody Shaw, Herb Morgan, Jimmy Anderson, Leo Johnson, and Larry Young.

Baraka along with Nettie Rogers hosted musical arts, dance acts, and poetry readings at the Cellar.

In 1974, Baraka organized an African women's conference that was held at Rutgers University.

In 1978, Amina and her spouse Amiri Baraka authored a collection of poems entitled Songs for the Masses.

In 1983 and 1987, Amina and Amiri Baraka co-edited Confirmation: An Anthology of African American Women, and The Music: Reflections on Jazz and Blues.

In 1992, Amina and Amiri Baraka founded Kimako's Blues People, an art space that featured Newark artists.

In 1992, Amina and Amiri Baraka, co-edited the poetry book 5 Boptrees.

In 1994, Baraka's poetry was in the anthology Unsettling America: An Anthology of Contemporary Multicultural Poetry.
 
In 1995, Baraka participated in the Black Women's United Front in Detroit, Michigan.

In 1998, Baraka was a founding member of the Black Radical Congress in Chicago, Illinois.

In 2001, Baraka's poetry is included in a collection called Bum Rush the Page: A Def Poetry Jam.

In 2014, she published a collection of her poetry titled Blues in All Hues.

Film credits
 2016: Word Warriors III
 2007: Keep it Clean
 2006: The Pact
 2002: Strange Fruit (documentary)

Onstage
Stage productions in Amiri Baraka's A Black Mass, Slave Ship, Mad Heart, and Home on the Range.

Recordings
 2017: CD The Red Microphone
 2008: CD recording Variations in Time: A Jazz Perspective

Director
 Co-directed the word-music ensemble Blue Ark: The Word

Personal life
Amina married Walter Vernon Mason in 1960. At that time she was known as Sylvia Robinson. They had two daughters, Vera and Wanda.

In 1966, Amina married Amiri Baraka, who at that time he was known as LeRoi Jones. They have five children. Their son Ras Baraka became the Mayor of Newark, New Jersey.

Awards and honors
In 2015, Baraka received a certification of appreciation from the Black Nia F.O.R.C.E. (Freedom Organization for Racial and Cultural Enlightenment).

In 2015, she was honored with a Lifetime Achievement award by the New York Friends of People's World newspaper.

In 2022, Mrs. Baraka received an Unsung Hero award from 211 Community Impact, a non-profit that was co-founded by Dupre' Kelly of Lords of the Underground

References

External links
 Amina Baraka - Speaks of her son
 Amina Baraka - interview with Herb Glenn
 Amina Baraka - interview with Herb Glenn part 2
 "The Black Woman (Amina Baraka)". 1970 discussion.

1942 births
20th-century American dramatists and playwrights
20th-century African-American women writers
20th-century African-American writers
20th-century American poets
20th-century American women writers
21st-century African-American people
21st-century African-American women
African-American poets
American communists
National Endowment for the Arts Fellows
Newark Arts High School alumni
Poets from New Jersey
Women anthologists
Writers from Newark, New Jersey
Writers from Charlotte, North Carolina
Living people